The men's  68 kg competition of the taekwondo events at the 2015 Pan American Games took place on July 20 at the Mississauga Sports Centre. The defending Pan American Games champion was Jhohanny Jean of the Dominican Republic.

Qualification

All athletes qualified through the qualification tournament held in March 2015 in Mexico, while host nation Canada was permitted to enter one athlete.

Schedule
All times are Eastern Daylight Time (UTC-4).

Results

Main bracket
The final results were:

Bronze medal matches

References

Taekwondo at the 2015 Pan American Games